Schwan's Company, formerly known as The Schwan Food Company, is a food company with approximately 7,500 employees.  Having originated in the United States as a family-owned business, since 2019 the company has been a subsidiary of CJ CheilJedang of South Korea — with five major business units including Schwan's Consumer Brands, Schwan's Food Service, Strategic Partner Solutions and SFC Global Supply Chain. Schwan's Company no longer owns the home-delivery business that was known as Schwan's Home Service.

The Schwan's family maintains 100 percent ownership of Minnesota-based Schwan’s Home Service, a privately held, independent entity tracing to the company’s home-delivery business launched by Marvin Schwan in 1952. Schwan's Home Service sells frozen foods from home delivery trucks, in grocery store freezers, by mail, and to the food service industry. As of 2022, Schwan's Home Service will be rebranded as Yelloh.

Schwan's Company is widely known for its consumer brands, including Red Baron, Freschetta, Tony's, Mrs. Smith's, Edwards, and Pagoda.

Corporate divisions 
The company's major business units include Schwan's Consumer Brands, Schwan's Food Service, and SFC Global Supply Chain.

Schwan's Consumer Brands markets frozen food products in grocery stores primarily in the Western Hemisphere.

Schwan's Food Service markets and distributes frozen-food products to the food service industry.

SFC Global Supply Chain is a manufacturing cooperative that coordinates the company's production processes and helps develop new products.

Company history 
In 1952, Marvin Schwan (1929–1993) began home delivery of his family's homemade ice cream (Schwan's Dairy and Dairy Lunch) to rural western Minnesota. Schwan's expanded to cover the Midwestern United States and made a number of acquisitions, including the Holiday Ice Cream Company and Russell Dairy. In 1957, the product line was expanded to include juice concentrates, and in 1962, Schwan's began selling frozen fish products.

During the 1970s, the company began selling pizza to schools, launched the Red Baron pizza brand for sale in grocery stores, and formed the Red Baron Squadron flight team to promote the brand. During the 1980s, Schwan's made further acquisitions, including pizza manufacturer Sabatasso Foods and Asian-foods manufacturer Minh Food Corporation. Schwan's opened a plant in Leyland, Preston, England in 1989. In 1990 Schwans started Schwans Canada, with an ice cream plant in Manitoba and routes in Saskatchewan and Alberta, but they ceased operations in December 1999.

In 1993, founder Marvin Schwan died of a heart attack at the age of 64. The Marvin Schwan Memorial Drive in Marshall is named after him. His older brother, Alfred Schwan, who had been the company's head of manufacturing, was named president.

In October 1994, the Minnesota Department of Health informed the company that 67 people in southern Minnesota had been infected with salmonella enteritis and that there was a strong statistical link between the illnesses and Schwan's ice cream. Schwan quickly halted the production and sale of the company's ice cream and began a public-awareness campaign asking people not to eat Schwan's ice cream products. An investigation found that the source of the contamination was a contractor's truck that had delivered ice cream pre-mix to Schwan's. The trucking company had inadequately washed the tanker truck after transporting raw, unpasteurized eggs. Schwan's actions in response to the recall were unconventional at the time and have since been imitated by companies facing recalls.

In 1996, Schwan's introduced the Freschetta pizza line and acquired La Roue du Pays d'Auge, a frozen foods producer in France. In 1998, Schwan's opened a pizza plant in Osterweddingen, Germany. In 2001, Schwan's acquired the Edwards dessert company from Ripplewood Holdings, and in 2003, the Mrs. Smith's dessert company from Flowers Foods. Also in 2003, the corporation changed its name from Schwan's Sales Enterprises to The Schwan Food Company.

In 2010, Schwan's teamed up with the TV series Top Chef and served dishes that were made famous by chefs that were featured on the Bravo television series.

In February 2019, the company announced it had completed the sale of 80% of the privately-held company's stock to CJ CheilJedang of South Korea, effectively ending the Schwan family's control of the company. Schwan's will operate as a subsidiary of CJ, but the family will continue to control 100% of the operations of the Schwan's Home Delivery Service. In March 2022, Schwan's Home Delivery announced that it was rebranding as Yelloh, a reference to the color of its trucks.

Red Baron Squadron 
The Red Baron Squadron was established in 1979 as a promotion for Red Baron Pizza. The squadron flew five vintage Stearman biplanes modified with 450 hp engines. A separate 38-foot support vehicle followed with spare parts and engines. They attended air shows throughout the country and flew formation aerobatics. Their base of operations and air museum was at the Southwest Minnesota Regional Airport in Marshall, Minnesota. In 2007, after 28 years of flying, the company announced the retirement of the squadron.

References

External links
Official site
Home delivery site

Food recalls
Privately held companies based in Minnesota
Food and drink companies based in Minnesota
Frozen food brands
Food and drink companies established in 1952
1952 establishments in Minnesota
Frozen pizza brands
Lyon County, Minnesota
American subsidiaries of foreign companies
2019 mergers and acquisitions
CJ Group